"Farmer's Daughter" is a song by American singer-songwriter Crystal Bowersox from her debut album of the same name.

Background
The first single of the album was to be "Hold On", though Crystal Bowersox insisted that "Farmer's Daughter" be the debut single. Due to co-writing issues with Kara DioGuardi and Nickelback lead singer Chad Kroeger, the single was dropped.

The song reflects on Crystal's tumultuous and abusive relationship with her mother while growing up.

Music video
The music video was directed by Meiert Avis and released on December 15, 2010, a day after the album's release. The video begins with Bowersox singing in a room while watching a flashback memory of losing her mother and walked alone. The next scene takes place at a school where Bowersox, now a teenager, is walking on crutches (a reference to the lyric "I told the school that I fell down the stairs") Then Bowersox is knitting a coat while watching the television. The video ends when a child jumps into Bowersox's arms.

Critical reception
The single has received mostly positive reviews.  The Chicago Tribune says "the album finds its stride with the title song, a brutally plainspoken and poignant portrayal of childhood abuse."

Charts

References

External links

2010 songs
2010 singles
Crystal Bowersox songs
Music videos directed by Meiert Avis
Jive Records singles
19 Recordings singles
Songs about farmers